Alif Jaelani Ruslan (born 5 July 2002) is an Indonesian professional footballer who plays as an attacking midfielder for Liga 2 club PSPS Riau.

Club career

Barito Putera
He was signed for Barito Putera to play in Liga 1 in the 2021 season. Alif made his professional debut on 23 September 2021 in a match against Persikabo 1973 at the Wibawa Mukti Stadium, Cikarang.

Career statistics

Club

Notes

References

External links
 Alif Jaelani at Soccerway
 Alif Jaelani at Liga Indonesia

2002 births
Living people
Indonesian Muslims
Sportspeople from South Sulawesi
People from Makassar
Indonesian footballers
Liga 1 (Indonesia) players
PS Barito Putera players
Association football midfielders